A volcanic winter is a reduction in global temperatures caused by volcanic ash and droplets of sulfuric acid and water obscuring the Sun and raising Earth's albedo (increasing the reflection of solar radiation) after a large, particularly explosive volcanic eruption. Long-term cooling effects are primarily dependent upon injection of sulfur gases into the stratosphere where they undergo a series of reactions to create sulfuric acid which can nucleate and form aerosols. Volcanic stratospheric aerosols cool the surface by reflecting solar radiation and warm the stratosphere by absorbing terrestrial radiation. The variations in atmospheric warming and cooling result in changes in tropospheric and stratospheric circulation.

Historic examples
The effects of volcanic eruptions on recent winters are modest in scale, but historically have been significant.

Toba supereruption
A proposed volcanic winter occurred around 71,000–73,000 years ago following the supereruption of Lake Toba on Sumatra island in Indonesia. Some scientists hypothesize that the eruption caused an immediate return to a glacial climate by accelerating an ongoing continental glaciation, causing massive population reduction among animals and human beings. Others argue that the climatic effects of the eruption were too weak and brief to affect early human populations to the degree proposed. This, combined with the abrupt occurrence of most human differentiations in that same period, is a probable case of bottleneck linked to volcanic winters (see Toba catastrophe theory). On average, super-eruptions with total eruptive masses of at least 10kg (Toba eruptive mass = 6.9 × 10kg) occur every 1 million years. However, archaeologists who in 2013 found a microscopic layer of glassy volcanic ash in sediments of Lake Malawi, and definitively linked the ash to the 75,000-year-old Toba super-eruption, went on to note a complete absence of the change in fossil type close to the ash layer that would be expected following a severe volcanic winter. This result led the archaeologists to conclude that the largest known volcanic eruption in the history of the human species did not significantly alter the climate of East Africa.

1159 BCE
The Hekla 3 eruption in Iceland may have been responsible for the Late Bronze Age collapse around the Eastern Mediterranean by causing crop failures and forcing migrations further West among the so-called Sea Peoples.

536
The volcanic winter of 536 was most likely linked to a volcanic eruption. The latest theorised explanation is the Tierra Blanca Joven (TBJ) eruption of the Ilopango caldera in central El Salvador.

945 or 946
The 946 eruption of Paektu Mountain is believed to have caused a major global climatic impact, with regional anomalies of colder weather and snowfall from 945 to 948.

1257
The 1257 Samalas eruption in Indonesia. The eruption left behind a large caldera next to Rinjani, with Lake Segara Anak inside it. This eruption  probably had a Volcanic Explosivity Index of 7, making it one of the largest eruptions of the current Holocene epoch. 

An examination of ice cores showed a large spike in sulfate deposition around 1257. This was strong evidence of a large eruption having occurred somewhere in the world. In 2013, scientists proved that the eruption occurred at Mount Samalas. This eruption had four distinct phases, alternately creating eruption columns reaching tens of kilometres into the atmosphere and pyroclastic flows burying large parts of Lombok Island. The flows destroyed human habitations, including the city of Pamatan. Ash from the eruption fell as far away as Java Island. The eruption was witnessed by people who recorded it on palm leaves, the Babad Lombok. Later volcanic activity created additional volcanic centres in the caldera, including the Barujari cone that remains active. The aerosols injected into the atmosphere reduced the solar radiation reaching the Earth's surface, which cooled the atmosphere for several years and led to famines and crop failures in Europe and elsewhere, although the exact scale of the temperature anomalies and their consequences is still debated. It is possible that the eruption helped trigger the Little Ice Age.

1315-1317
The Great Famine of 1315–1317 in Europe may have been precipitated by a volcanic event, perhaps that of Mount Tarawera, New Zealand, lasting about five years.

1452 or 1453
A cataclysmic eruption, the 1452/1453 mystery eruption, caused worldwide disruptions.

1600
The Huaynaputina in Peru erupted. Tree ring studies show that 1601 was cold. Russia had its worst famine in 1601–1603. From 1600 to 1602, Switzerland, Latvia and Estonia had exceptionally cold winters. The wine harvest was late in 1601 in France, and in Peru and Germany, wine production collapsed. Peach trees bloomed late in China, and Lake Suwa in Japan froze early.

1783
The eruption of the Laki volcano in Iceland released enormous amounts of sulfur dioxide, resulting in the death of much of the island's livestock and a catastrophic famine which killed a quarter of the Icelandic population. It has been estimated that 23,000 British people died from the poisoning. The winter of 1783–1784 was very severe, and estimated to have caused 8,000 additional deaths in the UK. The meteorological impact of Laki continued, contributing significantly to several years of extreme weather in Europe. In France, the sequence of extreme weather events contributed significantly to an increase in poverty and famine that may have contributed to the French Revolution in 1789. Laki was only one factor in a decade of climatic disruption, as Grímsvötn was erupting from 1783 to 1785, and there may have been an unusually strong El Niño effect from 1789 to 1793. A paper written by Benjamin Franklin in 1783 blamed the unusually cool summer of 1783 in North America on volcanic dust coming from this eruption, though Franklin's proposal has been questioned.

1815
The 1815 eruption of Mount Tambora, a stratovolcano in Indonesia. The eruption had a Volcanic Explosivity Index of 7. The eruption was the largest in recorded human history and one of largest in the Holocene (10,000 years to present). The eruption led to global cooling and worldwide harvest failures caused what came to be known as the "Year Without a Summer" of 1816. Europe, still recuperating from the Napoleonic Wars, suffered from food shortages. Food riots broke out in the United Kingdom and France, and grain warehouses were looted. The violence was worst in landlocked Switzerland, where famine caused the government to declare a national emergency. Huge storms and abnormal rainfall with flooding of Europe's major rivers (including the Rhine) are attributed to the event, as is the August frost. A major typhus epidemic occurred in Ireland between 1816 and 1819, precipitated by the famine. An estimated 100,000 Irish people perished during this period. A BBC documentary, using figures compiled in Switzerland, estimated that the fatality rates in 1816 were twice that of average years, giving an approximate European fatality total of 200,000 deaths. The corn crop in Northeastern North America failed, due to mid-summer frosts in New York State and June snowfalls in New England and Newfoundland and Labrador. The crop failures in New England, Canada, and parts of Europe also caused the price of wheat, grains, meat, vegetables, butter, milk, and flour to rise sharply.

1883
The explosion of Krakatoa (Krakatau) may have contributed to volcanic winter-like conditions. The four years following the explosion were unusually cold, and the winter of 1887–1888 included powerful blizzards. Record snowfalls were recorded worldwide. However, the period of cold winters started with the 1882–1883 winter, months before the Krakatoa eruption.

1991
The 1991 eruption of Mount Pinatubo, a stratovolcano in the Philippines, cooled global temperatures for about 2–3 years.

Effects on life

The causes of the population bottleneck – a sharp decrease in a species' population, immediately followed by a period of great genetic divergence (differentiation) among survivors – is attributed to volcanic winters by some researchers. Such events may diminish populations to "levels low enough for evolutionary changes, which occur much faster in small populations, to produce rapid population differentiation".  With the Lake Toba bottleneck, many species showed massive effects of narrowing of the gene pool, and Toba may have reduced the human population to between 15,000 and 40,000, or even fewer.

See also
 Global dimming
 Impact winter
 Nuclear winter
 Timeline of volcanism on Earth

References

Further reading

External links

 
Winter
Winter
Doomsday scenarios
Events that forced the climate
Geological hazards